Anni Hammergaard Hansen (born Jørgensen) (1930–2000) was a Danish retired badminton player.

Career
Hansen won the women's doubles title at the 1957 All England Badminton Championships with Kirsten Granlund. She won four National championships  and also represented Denmark at the 1957 Uber Cup.

Medal Record at the All England Badminton Championships

References

Danish female badminton players
1930 births
2000 deaths